Zichichi is an Italian surname. Notable people with the surname include:

 Alvise Zichichi (1938–2003), Italian chess master
 Antonino Zichichi (born 1929), Italian physicist

Italian-language surnames